was a Japanese politician of the New Komeito Party, a member of the House of Representatives in the Diet (national legislature). He served as Minister of Land, Infrastructure and Transport as well as Minister of State for Tourism Promotion in Prime Minister Yasuo Fukuda's Cabinet.

Fuyushiba was born in Shenyang (which was then known as Hōten) in the Japanese-occupied territory of Manchukuo, in what is now northeastern China. He graduated from Kansai University in 1960 before working as a lawyer. He was elected to the House of Representatives for the first time in 1986.

Fuyushiba died on December 5, 2011, aged 75, of acute pneumonia at a hospital in Amagasaki, Hyogo Prefecture.

References

External links
 New Komeito profile 
 Tetsuzo Fuyushiba official site 

2011 deaths
1936 births
Japanese people from Manchukuo
New Komeito politicians
Kansai University alumni
Members of the House of Representatives (Japan)
Ministers of Land, Infrastructure, Transport and Tourism of Japan
Deaths from pneumonia in Japan
21st-century Japanese politicians